Tiruvottriyur Tyagayyar (1845–1917) was a Carnatic music composer. He was the son of the composer Veena Kuppayyar.

His style was very much similar to that of tyagaraja just like his father. He was also known as 'Mutyalapeta Tyagayyar' based on his Nivasam and also was known as 'Swarasimha Tyagayyar'. His first Guru was his father's disciple Fiddle Ponnuswamy. He was dedicated to music for life. His home was a paradise for Rasikas and also many famous Vaggeyakaras. He was also very fluent in making Pallavis and Swarakalpana.

He was also proficient in playing Veena. His compositions mainly included Tana Varnas. Some of his famous compositions are

 Chalamela in Darbar
 Kapadu Gananatha in dhanyasi (A Praardhana)
 Sarasvati nanneppudu in Kalyani
 Tyagarajaswami Guruni in Kharaharapriya
 Kashtamulu teerchinanu in Punnagavarali
 Navaratna malika
 Ituvanti in Pantuvarali
 Sarasiruhanayana in Manirangu
 Karunimpa in Sahana

He also tuned some Narayana Teertha Tarangalu. His main disciples include Ponnayya Pillai. He had influence on Muthiah Bhagavatar's compositions too.

He composed mainly in the Telugu language.

See also
 List of Carnatic composers

References

External links
 

1845 births
Place of birth missing
1917 deaths
Place of death missing
Carnatic composers
20th-century Indian musicians
Carnatic musicians
Indian classical composers